Centre-du-Québec (Central Quebec) is a region of Quebec, Canada. The main centres are Drummondville, Victoriaville, and Bécancour.

Description

The Centre-du-Québec region was established as an independent administrative region of Quebec on July 30, 1997 (in effect August 20 upon publication in the Gazette officielle du Québec); prior to this date, it formed the southern portion of the Mauricie–Bois-Francs region (the northern part of which is now known simply as Mauricie).

Centre-du-Québec is not located in the geographic centre of Quebec, though it is approximately located in the centre of the southern portion of the province. Some consider the name Bois-Francs to be synonymous with the Centre-du-Québec region; others see it as being synonymous with Arthabaska Regional County Municipality, with its main city Victoriaville earning the title Capitale des Bois-Francs (capital of the Bois-Francs).

The Centre-du-Québec is a primarily agricultural region known as the breadbasket of Quebec; major products include livestock and poultry, dairy products, as well as food crops such as cereals, vegetables, and fruits such as apples and cranberries. Forestry is also a major industry; the name "Bois-Francs" refers to the French term for hardwood, referring to the high density of hardwood forests in the area. Other major industries of the area include transportation, recycling, woodworking and cabinetmaking.

The Centre-du-Québec region derives great benefit from its central location; major centres such as Montreal and Quebec City are within an hour and a half's drive, while secondary centres such as Sherbrooke and Trois-Rivières are close at hand.

Administrative divisions

Regional county municipalities

Nation Waban-Aki
The Centre-du-Québec region is home to several thousand members of the Wabanaki Nation.  They are scattered throughout the region, with two major population centres:

 Odanak, Quebec
 Wôlinak, Quebec

Major communities
Bécancour
Daveluyville
Drummondville
Nicolet
Plessisville (city)
Plessisville (parish)
PrincevilleSaint-Christophe-d'Arthabaska
Saint-Cyrille-de-Wendover
Saint-Germain-de-Grantham
Saint-Léonard-d'Aston
Victoriaville
Warwick
Wickham

Highways
Main highways in the region include:
Autoroute 20
Autoroute 30
Autoroute 55
Route 116
Route 122
Route 132
Route 161

See also
List of regions of Quebec
Quebec municipal elections, 2005, results in Centre-du-Québec

References

External links

 Centre-du-Québec official website
 Centre-du-Québec government portal
Centre-du-Québec tourist site
 Toile Jeunesse, a regional youth-oriented portal
 
 CRÉ|

 
Administrative regions of Quebec